The Goldberg–Coxeter construction or Goldberg–Coxeter operation (GC construction or GC operation) is a graph operation defined on regular polyhedral graphs with degree 3 or 4. It also applies to the dual graph of these graphs, i.e. graphs with triangular or quadrilateral "faces". The GC construction can be thought of as subdividing the faces of a polyhedron with a lattice of triangular, square, or hexagonal polygons, possibly skewed with regards to the original face: it is an extension of concepts introduced by the Goldberg polyhedra and geodesic polyhedra. The GC construction is primarily studied in organic chemistry for its application to fullerenes, but it has been applied to nanoparticles, computer-aided design, basket weaving, and the general study of graph theory and polyhedra.

History 
Michael Goldberg introduced the Goldberg polyhedron in 1937. Buckminster Fuller coined the term "geodesic dome" in the 1940s, although he largely kept the mathematics behind the domes a trade secret. Geodesic domes are the geometric dual of (a section of) a Goldberg polyhedron: a full geodesic dome can be thought of as a geodesic polyhedron, dual to the Goldberg polyhedron. In 1962, Donald Caspar and Aaron Klug published an article on the geometry of viral capsids that applied and expanded upon concepts from Goldberg and Fuller. H.S.M. Coxeter published an article in 1971 covering much of the same information. Caspar and Klug were the first to publish the most general correct construction of a geodesic polyhedron, making the name "Goldberg–Coxeter construction" an instance of Stigler's law of eponymy.

The discovery of Buckminsterfullerene in 1985 motivated research into other molecules with the structure of a Goldberg polyhedron. The terms "Goldberg–Coxeter fullerene" and "Goldberg–Coxeter construction" were introduced by Michel Deza in 2000. This is also the first time the degree 4 case was considered.

Construction
This section largely follows Deza et al.'s two articles.

Master polygons

Regular lattices over the complex plane can be used to create "master polygons". In geodesic dome terminology, this is the "breakdown structure" or "principal polyhedral triangle" (PPT). The 4-regular case uses the square lattice over the Gaussian integers, and the 3-regular case uses triangular lattice over the Eisenstein integers. For convenience, an alternate parameterization of the Eisenstein integers is used, based on the sixth root of unity instead of the third. The usual definition of Eisenstein integers uses the element .  A norm, is defined as the square of the absolute value of the complex number. For 3-regular graphs this norm is the T-number or triangulation number used in virology.

The master polygon is an equilateral triangle or square laid over the lattice. The table to the right gives formulas for the vertices of the master polygons in the complex plane, and the gallery below shows the (3,2) master triangle and square. So that the polygon can be described by a single complex number, one vertex is fixed at 0.

Master polygons, and the operator , can be classified as follows:
 Class I: 
 Class II: 
 Class III: all other.
Below are tables of master triangles and squares. Class I corresponds to the first column, and Class II corresponds to the diagonal with a slightly darker background.

Master polygons for triangles

Master polygons for squares 

Composition of Goldberg–Coxeter operations corresponds to multiplication of complex numbers. There are some useful consequences of this:
 The application of repeated Goldberg–Coxeter operations is commutative and associative.
 Complex conjugation of the element  or  corresponds to reflection of the constructed graph.
 Since the Gaussian integers and Euclidean integers are both Euclidean domains, elements of those domains can be uniquely factored into prime elements. Therefore, it also makes sense to decompose a Goldberg–Coxeter operator into a sequence of "prime" Goldberg–Coxeter operators, and this sequence is unique (up to rearrangement).

Performing the GC construction
The steps of performing the GC construction are as follows:
 If operating on a 3- or 4-regular graph (instead of a graph with triangular/quadrilateral faces), take its dual graph. This dual graph will have triangular or quadrilateral faces.
 Replace the faces of the triangulated/quadrangulated graph with the master polygon. Be aware that planar graphs have an "external" face that must be replaced as well. In the below example, this is done by attaching it to one side of the graph and connecting other sides as necessary. This temporarily introduces overlapping edges into the graph, but the resulting graph is planar. The vertices can be rearranged so that there are no overlapping edges.
 If the original graph was a 3- or 4-regular graph, take the dual of the result of step 3. Otherwise, the result of step 3 is the GC construction.

Below is an example, where  is constructed on the skeleton of a cube. (Dotted lines are normal graph edges, just drawn differently to make overlapping graph edges more visible.)

Extensions
The Goldberg–Coxeter construction can be easily extended to some non-planar graphs, such as toroidal graphs. Class III operators, because of their chirality, require a graph that can be embedded on an orientable surface, but class I and II operators can be used on non-orientable graphs.

See also

Geodesic grid
Quadrilateralized spherical cube
Loop subdivision surface
Catmull–Clark subdivision surface
Conway polyhedron notation

Footnotes

References

Graph operations
Polyhedra